Patty Hearst is a 1988 American biographical film directed by Paul Schrader and stars Natasha Richardson as Hearst Corporation heiress Patricia Hearst and Ving Rhames as Symbionese Liberation Army leader Cinque. It is based on Hearst's 1982 autobiography Every Secret Thing (co-written with Alvin Moscow), which was later rereleased as Patty Hearst – Her Own Story.

The film depicts the kidnapping of student Patty Hearst by the Symbionese Liberation Army, her transformation into an active follower of the SLA after a long-lasting imprisonment and process of purported brainwashing, and her final arrest after a series of armed robberies.

Cast
 Natasha Richardson – Patricia Hearst
 William Forsythe – William "Teko" Harris
 Ving Rhames – Cinque Mtume
 Frances Fisher – Yolanda
 Jodi Long – Wendy Yoshimura
 Olivia Barash – Fahizah
 Dana Delany – Gelina
 Marek Johnson – Zoya
 Kitty Swink – Gabi
 Peter Kowanko – Cujo (as Pete Kowanko)
 Tom O'Rourke – Jim Browning
 Scott Kraft – Steven Weed
 Jeff Imada – Neighbor
 Ermal Williamson – Randolph A. Hearst
 Elaine Revard – Catherine Hearst
 Destiny Reyes Allstun - Vicky Hearst

Production
The film was written by Nicholas Kazan (son of Oscar-winning director Elia Kazan) drawing narration from Hearst's memoir.

Patty Hearst premiered at the 1988 Cannes Film Festival on May 13 in the feature film competition. The film opened on September 23, 1988, in the US and grossed $601,680 in its opening weekend. It made a total domestic gross of $1,223,326.

Reception
The film garnered a generally mixed critical response, although Richardson's performance was applauded by most critics. Amongst credited critics, the film has a rating of 45% positive reactions on Rotten Tomatoes, with 11 reviews counted. Vincent Canby of The New York Times wrote that "Patty Hearst is a beautifully produced movie, seen entirely from Patty's limited point of view. It is stylized at times, utterly direct and both shocking and grimly funny." Roger Ebert writing for the Chicago Sun-Times praised Richardson's performance: "The entire film centers on the remarkable performance by Natasha Richardson as Hearst." but concluded that "This whole story seemed so much more exciting from the outside."

Pauline Kael called the film "a lean, impressive piece of work" and even suggested that it answered the longstanding mystery about Hearst: "Did Patty Hearst become part of the S.L.A. willingly, out of conviction, or was she simply trying to save her life? The movie shows you that, in the state she was in, there was no difference. Natasha Richardson, who plays Patty, has been handed a big unwritten role; she feels her way into it, and she fills it. We feel how alone and paralyzed Patty is — she retreats to being a hidden observer. Patty is a girl who is raped in mind and body, and no longer knows when it started."

References

External links

New Yorker review by Richard Brody
Official site

1988 films
1988 drama films
1980s biographical drama films
American biographical drama films
Biographical films about criminals
Biographical films about people convicted on terrorism charges
Crime films based on actual events
Films about kidnapping
Films directed by Paul Schrader
Atlantic Entertainment Group films
Cultural depictions of Patty Hearst
Films set in the 1970s
1980s English-language films
1980s American films